Gordon Williamson may refer to:

John Gordon Williamson (born 1936), cricket player
Gordon Williamson (writer) (born 1951), popular history writer